Shafter is a city in Kern County, California, United States. The population was 16,988 at the 2010 census, up from 12,736 at the 2000 census. The city is located along State Route 43. Suburbs of Shafter include Myricks Corner, North Shafter, Smith Corner, and Thomas Lane.

History

The city of Shafter began as a loading dock along the Santa Fe Railroad (former San Francisco and San Joaquin Valley Railroad) right-of-way. The community was named for General William Rufus Shafter who commanded US Forces in Cuba during the Spanish–American War. Property was sold beginning in 1914 and the city incorporated on January 11, 1938.

The first post office opened in 1898, moved in 1902, closed in 1905. A new postal service started in 1914.

Shafter is home to Minter Field, which began operations in June 1941 and saw heavy use during World War II. Approximately 7,000 troops were stationed at the airstrip which hosted up to 600 prisoners of war as well. It is publicly owned and administered by the Minter Field Airport District and serves as an industrial center and airport for crop dusters and private aircraft. The Minter Field Museum is maintained on location as well.

The first truly successful human powered airplane, the Gossamer Condor, piloted by Bryan Allen won the Kremer prize on August 23, 1977, at Shafter's Minter Field. Allen piloted, and powered, the Paul MacCready designed airplane along the one mile long figure '8' course with two 10 foot high obstacles as specified by the Royal Aeronautical Society to claim the £50,000 prize. A California State Monument is located at the field for this event.

The Shafter Historical Society maintains two other museums. The Green Hotel and the Shafter Depot Museum emphasize various aspects of the daily lives of Shafter residents in years past; both structures are listed on the National Register of Historic Places.

In 2009, a Shafter High School senior, Anna Jelmini, received the key to the city for placing in the Junior Olympics. She also fell just short of meeting the standards for the 2008 Olympics.

In 2013 Shafter celebrated the 100 year anniversary of its founding. The Centennial Celebration included several events highlighting the history of the town, including a flyover of a PT-13 Training Plane that was stationed at Minter Field during World War II.

Geography

Climate

Demographics

2010
At the 2010 census Shafter had a population of 16,988. The racial makeup of Shafter was 8,150 (48.0%) White, 219 (1.3%) African American, 198 (1.2%) Native American, 111 (0.7%) Asian, 19 (0.1%) Pacific Islander, 7,645 (45.0%) from other races, and 646 (3.8%) from two or more races. Hispanic or Latino of any race were 13,634 persons (80.3%).

The census reported that 16,323 people (96.1% of the population) lived in households, 148 (0.9%) lived in non-institutionalized group quarters, and 517 (3.0%) were institutionalized.

There were 4,230 households, 2,583 (61.1%) had children under the age of 18 living in them, 2,562 (60.6%) were opposite-sex married couples living together, 720 (17.0%) had a female householder with no husband present, 365 (8.6%) had a male householder with no wife present.  There were 345 (8.2%) unmarried opposite-sex partnerships, and 34 (0.8%) same-sex married couples or partnerships. 446 households (10.5%) were one person and 203 (4.8%) had someone living alone who was 65 or older. The average household size was 3.86.  There were 3,647 families (86.2% of households); the average family size was 4.11.

The age distribution was 6,121 people (36.0%) under the age of 18, 2,126 people (12.5%) aged 18 to 24, 4,666 people (27.5%) aged 25 to 44, 2,951 people (17.4%) aged 45 to 64, and 1,124 people (6.6%) who were 65 or older.  The median age was 25.9 years. For every 100 females, there were 105.6 males.  For every 100 females age 18 and over, there were 107.5 males.

There were 4,521 housing units at an average density of 161.8 per square mile, of the occupied units 2,471 (58.4%) were owner-occupied and 1,759 (41.6%) were rented. The homeowner vacancy rate was 2.2%; the rental vacancy rate was 6.9%.  9,552 people (56.2% of the population) lived in owner-occupied housing units and 6,771 people (39.9%) lived in rental housing units.

2000
As of the census of 2000, there were 12,736 people in 3,293 households, including 2,759 families, in the city. The racial makeup of the city was 29.0% White, 2.0% Black or African American, 2.0% Native American, 0.75% Asian, 0.75% Pacific Islander, 0.25% from other races, and 0.25% from two or more races.  65.0% of the population is Hispanic or Latino of any race.

Of the 3,293 households 52.6% had children under the age of 18 living with them, 61.7% were married couples living together, 15.3% had a female householder with no husband present, and 16.2% were non-families. 13.3% of households were one person and 7.4% were one person aged 65 or older.  The average household size was 3.67 and the average family size was 3.98.

The age distribution was 36.6% under the age of 18, 11.7% from 18 to 24, 28.5% from 25 to 44, 15.0% from 45 to 64, and 8.1% 65 or older.  The median age was 26 years. For every 100 females, there were 104.3 males.  For every 100 females age 18 and over, there were 106.0 males.

The median income for a household in the city was $29,515, and the median family income  was $31,457. Males had a median income of $31,605 versus $21,603 for females. The per capita income for the city was $10,961.  About 22.5% of families and 29.2% of the population were below the poverty line, including 36.8% of those under age 18 and 11.0% of those age 65 or over.

Economy

Historically, much of Shafter's economy has been based on agriculture and ag-related industry. Local crops include almonds, pistachios, cotton, grapes and alfalfa as well as some carrots, potatoes and other vegetables. Cotton and potatoes have a special historical significance for the town of Shafter as leading industries in different periods of the town's development.

More recently Shafter has become a hub for a variety of economic endeavors including; manufacturing, logistics, and energy.

Rail Facility
It connects the BNSF Railway to tenants in the Paramount Logistics Park. This is the only rail served industrial park in the San Joaquin Valley. The Paramount Logistics Park (PLP) (formerly the International Trade and Transportation Center (ITTC)) was built to facilitate Central Valley access to ports in Long Beach and Los Angeles. Ross Dress for Less announced its plans to move into the PLP in 2013.

American Tire Distributors signed a 20-year lease with Roll Real Estate to lease over 1 million square feet of distribution space. The tire and wheel distributor has begun working out of a portion of the space as of Summer 2014, while the rest continues to be built out.

Modified Community Correctional Facility
The City of Shafter reopened the Shafter Modified Community Correctional Facility in 2013 after a two-year closure. Profits from the facility directly benefit public safety initiatives and the Shafter Education Partnership, focused on early literacy and college readiness.

Fiber-Optic Network
In 2006 the City of Shafter began construction on a 25-mile fiber-optic backbone ring. The city currently operates a 10 Gbit/s Ethernet network over the Shafter Connect network with near-zero unscheduled downtime since the network inception in 2007. The installed infrastructure will support 40 Gbit/s and faster speeds as technology standardizes. The network currently serves several areas of the city including:
 Shafter Core – Downtown municipal, educational and law enforcement facilities
 Minter Field Airport and Industrial Park development near Highway 99 and Lerdo Highway
 Paramount Logistics Park at 7th Standard Road and Zachary Avenue
 Future Residential/Commercial developments along 7th Standard Road between Calloway Drive and Zerker Road

The City of Shafter is the only municipality in the Central Valley that offers fiber-optic connections.

Education

Shafter is home to the Richland School District which oversees operation of four schools: Golden Oak Elementary School (K-6), Redwood Elementary School (K-6), Sequoia Elementary School (K-6) and Richland Junior High School. The district operates under the leadership of superintendent Mrs. Raquel Posadas-Gonzalez. Class sizes in grades K-3 average 20 students, while grades 4-8 average 30 students. The district has three libraries as well as a marching band program, Gifted And Talented Education (GATE), and Project Lead the Way’s Gateway to Technology Program.

Richland Schools are active in academic competitions, including Math Field Day, History Day, and the Oral Language Festival.

Math has been a strength of Richland Schools in recent years. The percentage of Richland 8th graders scoring “Proficient” or “Advanced” in Algebra quadrupled from 2008 (8%) to 2013 (33%), earning the Richland Junior High Algebra Department an Award from the Shafter Chamber of Commerce in 2013. In 2014, Richland students placed in the top three in four of eight categories at the Kern County Math Field Day Competition.

In 2014, Mr. Claudio Martinez from Richland's Sequoia Elementary was honored as the regional GATE Teacher of the Year from the Regional California Association for the Gifted.

Shafter is also home to Shafter High School, a member of the Kern High School District. It was built by architects Edwin J. Symmes and Clarence Cullimore in the late 1920s. Officially founded in 1928, Shafter High School has a history as old as the town itself. Today, it is administered by Principal Russell Shipley. The school has undergone many recent renovations including the construction of a new cafeteria and new classroom space to meet the needs of a growing student body. The school is also home to the historical Fred L. Starrh Performing Arts Center, a large theater building with a fully functional fly system. 

Shafter is also home to Kern Adventist Elementary. Kern Adventist Elementary is a small, one-teacher Christian school. It has been in operation for over 92 years.

Shafter Education Partnership
In 2010, the City of Shafter, the Richland School District, and Shafter High School formed the Shafter Education Partnership. The Partnership is funded by the City of Shafter with a 2014-15 budget allocation of $865,618.

In order to support its goal of forming a strong foundation in reading the Shafter Education Partnership distributes books for children to take home, offers summer and after school reading programs.

Shafter Learning Center

The Shafter Education Partnership, in conjunction with the Kern County Library and Richland School District, opened the Shafter Learning Center in June 2014. In that same year the building, which had housed the Shafter branch of the Kern County Library, was remodeled to include two classrooms and a computer lab. Classes are offered for students in the community and subjects range from math, keyboarding, art, science and reading to language courses. In 2021 the Kern County Shafter Library Branch closed. In response to the closure, the City of Shafter opened a municipal city library in the same building in partnership with Bakersfield College.

Mayors

Notable people
 Dean Florez – CA state senator, candidate Lt. Governor
 Annette Funicello - actress, singer, Mouseketeer; lived in Shafter for two years
 Anna Jelmini – Track and field athlete
 Larsen Jensen – Olympic medalist – Swimming
Joe O'Brien, Harness racing driver.

References

External links
 

1938 establishments in California
Cities in Kern County, California
Incorporated cities and towns in California
Populated places established in 1938